Tante Trude aus Buxtehude ("Aunt Trude from Buxtehude") is a 1971 West German comedy film directed by Franz Josef Gottlieb and starring Rudi Carrell, Ilja Richter and Theo Lingen. It was one of several German films in the wake of Some Like it Hot that used cross-dressing as a comic theme.

The film's sets were designed by Eberhard Schröder. Some of the film was shot in the Austrian city of Salzburg. It featured a number of songs performer by leading singers of the era.

Synopsis

On her 21st birthday Gerda, a young student is invited to a solicitor who tells her, Gerda has inherited one million Marks on her birthday from a deceased aunt and will be presented with a suitcase later that day.
When the suitcase is delivered to her apartment Gerda and her friends Morits, Rudi and Karin are disappointed to find it did not contain the money, but a heap of old fashioned identical granny dresses, all  looking the same. So she asks her friend Moritz, a gawky wannabe detective to sell them on to at least get some gain of her 'inheritance'. After Moritz trots off with the old dresses to sell them to a shop the man who previously delivered the case with the dresses comes back stating he had forgotten to deliver a letter which was part of the inheritance.
The letter reveals that Gerda is the beneficiary of the said inheritance, but to avoid any inheritance tax the money was placed in a bank deposit box in Austria and the key to that box sewn in one of these ten identical dresses.

Unknowingly of the events Moritz had already found the key and thoughtlessly put it in his pocket.

When he returns  with the money he got in turn for the dresses the friends reveal the whole mess and all are off to the shop where the dresses were sold to. However that owner of the shop had already sold them on to a fashion store owner in Kitzbühel, Austria, so the friends rush off to Austria and try to locate the buyers of the dress which all reside in the castle hotel, like an arrogant film star, a bad tempered mid aged woman with a dog a lady who works at the hotel or the slightly gawky Bruno. The chase is on, partially in disguise, which causes lots of errs and confusion, to locate and to check every single dress without being too obvious. Nevertheless a thief learns about the inheritance and wants to grab the inheritance for himself, he threatens the friends and demands the key. Unknowingly Moritz hands him the real deposit box key, that he had dismissed for just some random key before. The robber heads off ready to claim the inheritance.

In the end Rudi, as well as the hotel director and a dim witted hotel page crossdress up as the deceased aunt Trude and appear at the bank directors office.

Cast

See also
Tante Jutta aus Kalkutta (1953)
Tante Wanda aus Uganda (1957)

References

Bibliography

External links 

1971 films
West German films
German comedy films
1970s German-language films
1971 comedy films
Films directed by Franz Josef Gottlieb
Films scored by Gerhard Heinz
Gloria Film films
Cross-dressing in film
1970s German films